Norka Latamblet Daudinot  (born October 4, 1963) is a former female volleyball player from Cuba, who won a gold medal at the 1992 Summer Olympics.

References
Norka Latamblet's profile at Sports Reference.com
Interview with Norka Latamblet 

1963 births
Living people
Cuban women's volleyball players
Volleyball players at the 1992 Summer Olympics
Olympic volleyball players of Cuba
Olympic gold medalists for Cuba
Olympic medalists in volleyball
Medalists at the 1992 Summer Olympics
Pan American Games medalists in volleyball
Pan American Games gold medalists for Cuba
Medalists at the 1983 Pan American Games
Medalists at the 1987 Pan American Games
Medalists at the 1991 Pan American Games
21st-century Cuban women
20th-century Cuban women